Tayebi-ye Garmsiri-ye Shomali Rural District is a rural district (dehestan) in the Central District of Landeh County, Kohgiluyeh and Boyer-Ahmad Province, Iran. At the 2006 census, its population including portions detached to form Mugarmun District in 2012, was 7,358, in 1,386 families; excluding those portions, the population (as of 2006) was 5,352, in 1,016 families. The rural district has 28 villages.

References 

Rural Districts of Kohgiluyeh and Boyer-Ahmad Province
Landeh County